At the 14th annual Four Hills Tournament, Veikko Kankkonen became the only second athlete to win the tournament more than once, after he already emerged victorious two years before.

Participating nations and athletes

The national groups of Germany and Austria only competed at the two events in their respective countries.

Results

Oberstdorf
 Schattenbergschanze, Oberstdorf
30 December 1965

Garmisch-Partenkirchen
 Große Olympiaschanze, Garmisch-Partenkirchen
01 January 1966

Innsbruck
 Bergiselschanze, Innsbruck
2 December 1966

Bischofshofen
 Paul-Ausserleitner-Schanze, Bischofshofen
06 January 1966

Final ranking

References

External links
 FIS website
 Four Hills Tournament web site

Four Hills Tournament
1965 in ski jumping
1966 in ski jumping